There were 10 karate events at the 2014 South American Games in Santiago, Chile: 5 men's events and 5 women's events. The events were held over March 7–9.

Medal summary

Medal table

Men's events
Athletes in bold have qualified to compete at the 2015 Pan American Games in Toronto, Canada. Both Venezuela and Colombia elected to use the 2014 Central American and Caribbean Games as their qualifying event and thus are ineligible to qualify athletes here.

Women's events

References

2014 South American Games events
South American Games
2014